Graminea tomentosa is a species of beetle in the family Cerambycidae. It was described by Thomson in 1864. It is known from Brazil.

References

Calliini
Beetles described in 1864